Jenan Moussa (born 14 April 1984, Beirut) is an investigative reporter of the Dubai-based Al Aan TV network.

Early life and education 
She graduated from the American University of Science and Technology (AUST) and began to work for Al Aan, first in the office, but soon she was deployed as a field reporter in several countries such as Libya, Mali, Syria or Germany.

Journalistic career 
She published several reports which made worldwide headlines such as:

A report about the juridical situation in Timbuktu, Mali, during the rule of the Islamists in 2012–2013.   

An interview of the imprisoned Alexanda Kotey in Syria, who is a member of the so-called "The Beatles", a British group from the Islamic State (IS). 

And the research about Omaima Abdi, the widow of Deso Dogg, a German rapper who joined ISIL. She obtained her cellphone and traced her to Hamburg, Germany, where Omaima Abdi was detained in and prosecuted following her research.  

In October 2020, Omaima Abdi was issued a verdict condemning her to 3 years and 6 months imprisonment. 

Her reporting about ISIL came again to the news in September 2020, as the Combined Joint Task Force against the Islamic State  reported that Moussa has investigated the detention of the current leader of IS (September 2020) Mohammed Said Abd Al Rahman Al-Mawla in 2008 in Iraq by the United States, and has come to the conclusion that he has been betraying members of IS  and Al-Qaeda at the time. 

In January 2021, she was presented as the host of the new TV show from the Al Aan network.

Awards 
 In 2008, while still a student at the AUST, she was honored with the Ghassan Tueni Award.

 In 2019, she received the Shifa Gardi International Award.

References 

1984 births
Living people
Lebanese journalists
Lebanese women journalists
People from Beirut
American University of Science and Technology alumni
Investigative journalists